Nicola Tomacelli (died 1490) was a Roman Catholic prelate who served as Bishop of Cassano all'Jonio (1485–1490).

Biography
On 1 Sep 1485, Nicola Tomacelli was appointed during the papacy of Pope Innocent VIII as Bishop of Cassano all'Jonio. He served as Bishop of Cassano all'Jonio until his death in 1490.

References

External links and additional sources
 (for Chronology of Bishops) 
 (for Chronology of Bishops)  

15th-century Italian Roman Catholic bishops
Bishops appointed by Pope Innocent VIII
1490 deaths